Älvsbyn Municipality is a municipality in Norrbotten County in northern Sweden. Its seat is located in Älvsbyn.

The present municipality has the same size as the original one, created at the time the municipalities of Sweden were formed in 1863. 1948-1968 a part of it constituted a market town (köping) and a municipality of its own, but the entities were reunited in 1969.

Geography
The municipality stretches along the Pite River for about 60 kilometres in a naturesque surrounding.

Localities
There are four localities (or urban areas) in Älvsbyn Municipality:

The municipal seat in bold

Economy
Two main industries in the town of Älvsbyn are AB Älvsbyhus, which builds houses, and Polarbageriet AB, which is nationally famous for their breads.

Polarbageriet has a production of about 1.5 million breads a day. They do not make loaves, but rather flat slices of a whitish bread. Their main distribution is within Sweden, but a small export goes to Finland, Denmark, the United Kingdom, Germany and France, where it is popular to use for homemade pizza.

Älvsbyhus has its base in Älvsbyn, and one of its factories there too. It is Scandinavia's biggest producer of prefabricated homes in wood. Their average production is around two houses a day, although much of the production is located at other factories closer to the market.

RFN is a government military testing facility, not just for domestic use. It is one of very few places where live missiles can be tested over land, and attracts military testers from other countries as well.

There is also some tourism, with a popular place to visit in the nature reserve Storforsen, just west of Vidsel.

Sister cities
Älvsbyn Municipality has three sister cities:

 Fauske, Norway
 Haapavesi, Finland
 Monchegorsk, Russia

References

External links

Älvsbyn Municipality - Official site 
Älvsbyn Tourism

Municipalities of Norrbotten County